Yanga may refer to:

People
 Yanga (singer), South African singer-songwriter.
 Yanga people, an Aboriginal Australian people.
 Yanga Chief, South African musician.
 Gaspar Yanga, leader of a slave revolt in Spanish colonial Mexico.
 Yanga R. Fernández (born 1971), astronomer at the University of Hawaii.

Places
 Yanga, Burkina Faso, a village in Burkina Faso
 Yanga, Veracruz, a settlement in Mexico founded by Gaspar Yanga
 Yanga National Park, NSW, Australia

Sports
 Yanga F.C., a football club from Nyahururu, Kenya
 Young Africans S.C., nicknamed Yanga, a football club from Dar es Salaam, Tanzania

Insects
 Yanga (cicada) a genus of cicadas

See also
 Yangga, an Aboriginal Australian people
 Yangan (disambiguation)
 Yenga (disambiguation)